The 106th Street station was an express station on the demolished IRT Third Avenue Line in Manhattan, New York City. The station was opened on December 30, 1878, and had two levels. The lower level had two tracks and two side platforms and served local trains. The upper level had one track and two side platforms over the local tracks on the lower level and served express trains. It was built as part of the Dual Contracts. The express run from this stop to 42nd Street was the longest express segment out of all New York City elevated lines, bypassing eight local stations. This station closed on May 12, 1955, with the ending of all service on the Third Avenue El south of 149th Street.

References

 
 

IRT Third Avenue Line stations
Railway stations closed in 1878
Railway stations closed in 1955
1878 establishments in New York (state)
1955 disestablishments in New York (state)
Former elevated and subway stations in Manhattan

Third Avenue